Follo Folk High School (Follo Folkehøgskole in Norwegian) is located in Vestby, Viken county (fylke), Norway, a community of approximately 13,150 inhabitants.

The school accepts 105 students annually. The main campus houses a library, gymnasium with theatre stage, dance studio, auditorium, dining hall, workshops for arts and crafts, and a recording studio.

Follo Folk High School provides no vocational or professional training and awards no formal academic credits. However, students do complete a year of systematic education and receive a certificate of attendance showing their participation in different activities.

All instruction is held in Norwegian. Courses include personal training, dance/hiphop, vocals (solo and choir), musical theatre, band (non-orchestral) and film.

References

External links
Follo Folk High School
Folk High Schools in Norway

Folk high schools in Norway